This is a Herbie Mann discography. Mann spent his early years recording for a number of jazz oriented record labels, and signed with Atlantic Records in 1961. He recorded with them through the 1960s and 1970s, including their subsidiary Cotillion Records, where he ran his own imprint, Embryo Records, in the 1970s, for his records as well as other musicians. Mann also ran two independent record labels, Herbie Mann Music in the 1980s, and during the 1990s, Kokopelli Records. Minor reissues are not noted.

Discography

As leader

1954: East Coast Jazz Series No.4 (7-inch EP; Bethlehem BEP-125) also released as Herbie Mann (10-inch LP; Bethlehem BCP-1018)
1955: Flamingo (Bethlehem)
1955: The Herbie Mann-Sam Most Quintet (Bethlehem) - with Sam Most
1954-56: Herbie Mann Plays (Bethlehem) this is a reissue of Bethlehem BCP-1018 with 4 tracks added on.
1956: Love and the Weather (Bethlehem)
1956: Mann in the Morning (Prestige) also released as Herbie Mann in Sweden
1956: Herbie Mann with the Wessel Ilcken Trio (Epic) also released as Salute to the Flute
1957: Flute Flight  (Prestige) - with Bobby Jaspar
1957: Flute Soufflé (Prestige) - with Bobby Jaspar
1957: Sultry Serenade (Riverside)
1957: Salute to the Flute (Epic)
1957: The Jazz We Heard Last Summer (Savoy) - split album shared with Sahib Shihab
1957: Mann Alone (Savoy)
1957: Yardbird Suite (Savoy) - with Phil Woods
1957: Great Ideas of Western Mann (Riverside)
1957: Flute Fraternity (Mode) - with Buddy Collette
1957: The Magic Flute of Herbie Mann (Verve)
1958: Just Wailin'  (New Jazz) - with Charlie Rouse, Kenny Burrell and Mal Waldron
1959: Flautista!  (Verve)
1959: Herbie Mann's African Suite (United Artists) also released as St. Thomas
1960: Flute, Brass, Vibes and Percussion (Verve)
1960: The Common Ground (Atlantic)
1960: This Is My Beloved (accompaniment to a reading by Laurence Harvey of Walter Benton's poem, This Is My Beloved) (Atlantic)
1961: The Family of Mann (Atlantic)
1961: Herbie Mann at the Village Gate (Atlantic)
1961: Herbie Mann Returns to the Village Gate (Atlantic) [released 1963]
1962: Right Now (Atlantic)
1962: Brazil, Bossa Nova & Blues (United Artists) also released as Brazil Blues
1962: Nirvana (Atlantic) - with Bill Evans
1962: Do the Bossa Nova with Herbie Mann (Atlantic)
1963: Herbie Mann Live at Newport (Atlantic)
1964: Latin Fever (Atlantic)
1965: My Kinda Groove (Atlantic)
1965: Herbie Mann Plays The Roar of the Greasepaint – The Smell of the Crowd (Atlantic)
1965: Standing Ovation at Newport (Atlantic)
1965: Latin Mann (Columbia) also released as Big Boss Mann
1966: Monday Night at the Village Gate (Atlantic)
1966: Today! (Atlantic)
1966: Our Mann Flute (Atlantic)
1966: New Mann at Newport (Atlantic)
1966: Impressions of the Middle East (Atlantic)
1967: A Mann & A Woman (Atlantic) - with Tamiko Jones
1967: The Beat Goes On (Atlantic)
1967: The Herbie Mann String Album (Atlantic)
1967: Glory of Love (A&M/CTI)
1967: The Wailing Dervishes (Atlantic)
1968: Windows Opened (Atlantic)
1968: The Inspiration I Feel (Atlantic)
1968: Memphis Underground (Atlantic)
1968: Concerto Grosso in D Blues (Atlantic)
1969: Live at the Whisky a Go Go (Atlantic)
1969: Live at the Whisky 1969: The Unreleased Masters (Real Gone Music) [released 2016] 2-CD set
1969: Stone Flute (Embryo)
1970: Muscle Shoals Nitty Gritty (Embryo)
1971: Memphis Two-Step (Embryo)
1971: Push Push (Embryo) - with Duane Allman
1972: Mississippi Gambler (Atlantic)
1972: Hold On, I'm Comin' [live] (Atlantic)
1973: Turtle Bay (Atlantic)
1974: London Underground (Atlantic) - with Mick Taylor, Albert Lee 
1974: Reggae (Atlantic)
1974: First Light (Atlantic) - as by 'The Family of Mann'
1975: Discothèque (Atlantic)
1975: Waterbed (Atlantic)
1976: Surprises (Atlantic) - with Cissy Houston
1976: Reggae II (Atlantic)
1976: Bird in a Silver Cage (Atlantic)
1976: Gagaku & Beyond  (Finnadar/Atlantic)
1977: Herbie Mann & Fire Island (Atlantic)
1978: Brazil: Once Again (Atlantic)
1978: Super Mann (Atlantic)
1978: Yellow Fever (Atlantic)
1979: Sunbelt (Atlantic)
1980: All Blues/Forest Rain (Herbie Mann Music) - a live direct to disc recording at the Great American Music Hall.
1981: Mellow (Atlantic) - Cissy and Whitney Houston sing on a cover of Bob Marley's "Bend Down Low".
1983: Astral Island (Atlantic)
1985: See Through Spirits (Atlantic)
1987: Jasil Brazz (RBI)
1989: Opalescence (Gaia; reissue: Kokopelli)
1990: Caminho De Casa (Chesky)
1992: Deep Pocket (Kokopelli) [released 1994]
1995: Peace Pieces: The Music of Bill Evans (Kokopelli; reissue: Lightyear)
1997: 65th Birthday Celebration: Live at the Blue Note in New York City (Lightyear)
1997: America/Brasil (Lightyear)
1998: African Mann: Herbie Mann Live in Africa (Giraffe Music)
2000: Eastern European Roots (Lightyear)
2004: Beyond Brooklyn (MCG Jazz) with Phil Woods, Gil Goldstein, Jay Ashby

Compilations

1962: The Epitome of Jazz (Bethlehem) 
1963: Sound of Mann (Verve)
1965: The Best of Herbie Mann (Prestige)
1970: The Best of Herbie Mann (Atlantic)
1972: The Evolution of Mann (Atlantic) 2-LP
1973: Let Me Tell You (Milestone) 2-LP
1975: Early Mann: The Bethlehem Years, Volume 1 (Bethlehem)
1976: Early Mann: The Bethlehem Years, Volume 2 (Bethlehem)
1994: The Evolution of Mann: The Herbie Mann Anthology (Rhino) 2-CD set; Atlantic material
1994: Samba & Bossa Nova: Copacabana (Saludos Amigos [UK])
1996: Jazz Masters #56: Herbie Mann (Verve)
2002: The Best of the Atlantic Years (Collectables) 14-CD box set
2006: Introducing Herbie Mann (Warner Jazz/Rhino [UK])
2011: Herbie Mann: Original Album Series (Rhino [UPC: 081227977115]) 5-CD in a slipcase box set; reissues Herbie Mann At The Village Gate, Do The Bossa Nova With Herbie Mann, Nirvana (with Bill Evans' Trio), Muscle Shoals Nitty Gritty, and the live Hold On, I'm Comin' .
2017: It's a Funky Thing: The Very Best of Herbie Mann (Varèse Sarabande) Atlantic material originally edited and released as singles.

As sideman

With Air
Air (Embryo, 1971)
With The Atlantic Family
The Atlantic Family Live at Montreux (Atlantic, 1977)
With Chet Baker
Chet Baker Introduces Johnny Pace (Riverside, 1958) - with Johnny Pace
Chet (Riverside, 1958)
Chet Baker Plays the Best of Lerner and Loewe (Riverside, 1959)
With Count Basie
String Along with Basie (Roulette, 1960)
With Art Blakey
Orgy in Rhythm (Blue Note, 1957)
With Sarah Vaughan & Clifford Brown
Sarah Vaughan with Clifford Brown (EmArcy, 1954)
With Ralph Burns and Leonard Feather
Winter Sequence (MGM, 1954)
With Hank Jones
Bluebird (Savoy, 1955)
With Philly Joe Jones
Drums Around the World (Riverside, 1959)
With Michel Legrand
Legrand Jazz (Columbia 1959)
Scarlet Ribbons (Columbia 1959)
With Mundell Lowe
TV Action Jazz! (RCA Camden, 1959)
With Machito and His Afro Cuban Jazz Ensemble
Machito with Flute to Boot (Roulette, 1959)
With Howard McGhee
Life Is Just a Bowl of Cherries (Bethlehem, 1956)
With Carmen McRae
Carmen McRae (Bethlehem, 1955)
With Jay McShann
The Big Apple Bash (Atlantic, 1979)
With Paul Quinichette
Moods (EmArcy, 1954)
With Pete Rugolo
Rugolomania (Columbia, 1955)
New Sounds by Pete Rugolo (Harmony, 1954–55, [1957])
With A. K. Salim
Flute Suite (Savoy, 1957) - with Frank Wess
With Billy Taylor
Billy Taylor with Four Flutes (Riverside, 1959)
With Joe Wilder
The Pretty Sound (Columbia, 1959)

References

External links
[ Allmusic discography]
[ Allmusic credits]

Discographies of American artists
Jazz discographies
Discography